Mallika Kapoor is an Indian actress, working in the South Indian film industries mainly in Malayalam, Tamil and Kannada. She has also appeared in a few Telugu and Hindi films.

Biography
Kapoor was raised in a middle-class Punjabi family. Her father works in the merchant navy and her mother is a housewife. She is educated in fashion design.

Career
She started her film career through her debut Malayalam film Albudhadweep, alongside actor Prithviraj Sukumaran. Her Tamil debut was the leading role in Azhagai Irukkirai Bayamai Irukkirathu, alongside Bharath, and then subsequently in Vathiyar with Arjun. Her appearance Allare Allari, opposite Allari Naresh, was her first in Telugu. She has returned to the Malayalam scene in 2008 with Madambi.

She has two additional Tamil films to date: Arputha Theevu (dubbed from Malayalam), which was released in September 2006, and Vathiyar, which was released on Diwali.

Personal life

Currently she runs a home decor company called KiYAHH. The products are designed by herself.

She married an investment banker NRI from America in 2013. She currently lives in San Francisco.

Filmography

References

External links
 

Actresses from Delhi
Actresses in Tamil cinema
Living people
Actresses in Malayalam cinema
Actresses in Kannada cinema
Indian film actresses
1985 births
21st-century Indian actresses
Actresses in Telugu cinema
Actresses in Hindi cinema